"Bigger Than the Whole Sky" is a song recorded by American singer-songwriter Taylor Swift as a bonus track of her tenth studio album, Midnights, released on October 21, 2022. As such, it is the 15th track on the extended, (3am Edition) of the album surprise-released three hours after the standard edition. It was written solely by Swift, who produced it with Jack Antonoff.

Background

On August 28, 2022, Taylor Swift announced her tenth studio album, Midnights, set for release on October 21, 2022. The track-list was not immediately revealed. Jack Antonoff, a longtime collaborator of Swift who had worked with her since her fifth studio album 1989 (2014), was confirmed as a producer on Midnights by a video posted to Swift's Instagram account on September 16, 2022, titled "The making of Midnights."

On October 21, 2022, Midnights was released at 12:00 AM EDT. Three hours later, at 3:00 AM EDT, the Midnights (3am Edition) was released, containing "Bigger Than the Whole Sky".

Composition and lyrics
The song is about heartache after a significant event. Although the song's meaning is ambiguous, some listeners have felt a connection to in relation to miscarriages that they have experienced, with many using the song to share stories of their miscarriages on TikTok and other social media platforms. Some listeners have compared the song with Swift's single, "Ronan".

The first verse incorporates lyrics about being "sick with sadness". The chorus alludes to grieving over someone whom Swift never met. The second verse is about guilt. The second verse also mentions religion as possibly playing a part in the loss. In the song, Swift uses a "breathy upper register" to sing the word, "goodbye." Staff writer Shirley Li of The Atlantic described the song as elegiac.

Reception
Upon 3am Edition's release, all the album's 20 tracks debuted in the top-45 of the US Billboard Hot 100; "Bigger Than The Whole Sky" was at number 21.  On the Global 200, the track reached number 22. It peaked on national record charts, at number 19 on the Philippines Songs chart, at number 20 on the Canadian Hot 100, at number 31 on Hungary's Single Top 40 chart, at number 60 on the Billboard Vietnam Hot 100, and number 68 on Portugal's Top 100 Singles.

Charts

References 

2022 songs
Taylor Swift songs
Songs written by Taylor Swift
Song recordings produced by Taylor Swift
Song recordings produced by Jack Antonoff